The Amnesty of 1953 was the largest amnesty in the history of the  Soviet Union (and the whole history of Russia) in terms of the number of the released persons. It was declared by the March 27, 1953 Decree of the Supreme Soviet of the Soviet Union "About the Amnesty". Since it was signed by Kliment Voroshilov, it was initially known as the Voroshilov's amnesty. Later it has become known as Beria's amnesty, because it was initiated by March 26, 1953 Lavrenty Beria's draft. Between 1.2 million  and 1.35 million persons were freed.

The amnesty was applied to: 
all persons with imprisonment term up to 5 years
 all persons convicted for malfeasance and economic crimes, as well as for some minor military crimes
 all women with children of age up to 10 years, all pregnant women, all children of age up to 18 years
 all men older than 55 and women older than 50
 all persons with grave uncurable diseases
The amnesty was not applied to people with term over 5 years convicted for counter-revolutionary crimes, major theft of socialist property, banditism, and murder. Other acts of the amnesty included the reduction of imprisonment terms, dismissing  unfinished criminal proceedings which fit the above criteria, etc.

The amnesty was followed with the considerable rise of criminal activities, therefore it was partially rolled back and many criminal amnestees were imprisoned again.

See also
The Cold Summer of 1953, a 1988 Soviet crime film with the plot based on the post-amnesty crime rise

References

Gulag
Soviet law
1953 in the Soviet Union
Lavrentiy Beria